Peren Government College, is a general degree college in Peren, Nagaland. It offers undergraduate courses in arts and is affiliated to Nagaland University. This college was established in 1992.

Departments

Arts
English 
History 
Political Science 
Philosophy
Economics
Education

Accreditation
The college is recognized by the University Grants Commission (UGC).

References

External links

Colleges affiliated to Nagaland University
Universities and colleges in Nagaland
Educational institutions established in 1987
1987 establishments in Nagaland